Citheronia azteca is a moth of the family Saturniidae that lives in Guatemala, Belize and Mexico.

Description
The species larvae is white with black spots, while the male moth is orange coloured with white spots and gray lines.

References

Ceratocampinae
Moths of North America
Moths described in 1896
Moths of Central America